(née Umetani) is a Japanese politician.

Biography 
She was born in Tokyo the third daughter of Viscount Michitora Umetani, head of a former kuge family and Member of the House of Peers. She enrolled but later left Gakushuin University in 1961.  She has been married to Sen'ei Ikenobō (池坊 専永), the Ikenobō family patriarch, since 1963 and has two daughters, Yuki (池坊 由紀), the next head of the family, and Mika (池坊 美佳).

She was elected to the House of Representatives in the Diet (national legislature) for the first time in 1996 as a member of the New Frontier Party, which later split into several parties including the New Komeito Party.

She was a Komeito politician, but she was not a member of Sōka Gakkai as former Councillor Kunihiro Tsuzuki and Councillor Shozo Kusakawa.

References

External links 
 Official blog in Japanese.

1942 births
20th-century Japanese politicians
20th-century Japanese women politicians
21st-century Japanese politicians
21st-century Japanese women politicians
Female members of the House of Representatives (Japan)
Gakushuin University alumni
Kadōka
Living people
Members of the House of Representatives (Japan)
New Frontier Party (Japan) politicians
New Komeito politicians
Politicians from Tokyo